Charles Welchman Ling  was the inaugural Bishop of Banks and Torres.

Ling was educated at St Peter's College, Siota. After his ordination in 1969, Ling worked in the Solomon Islands, the New Hebrides and Vanuatu.

Ling died on his home island of Mota Lava in 2018.

References

2018 deaths
Alumni of St Peter's College, Siota
20th-century Anglican bishops in Oceania
Anglican bishops of Banks and Torres
Diocese of Banks and Torres